Miri-Sibuti Coral Reefs National Park is a protected area of coral reefs in Miri Division, Sarawak, Malaysia, off the island of Borneo. The park is a popular dive destination. The best time to dive is from late March through November each year. Popular diving sites includes Anemone Garden, Grouper Patch Reef, Atago Maru Wreck and Seafan Garden. There are also some wreck dives. It is one of Malaysia’s most recently discovered diving locations and the largest offshore national park created in the state of Sarawak.

The reefs house a wide diversity of marine creatures including soft corals like leather corals, sea whips, Bubble corals, staghorn corals, Dendronephthya and Gorgonia sea fans, as well as sponges including elephant ear spongees. Fish species include clown fish, yellow and blueback fusiliers, angelfish, butterfly fish, sea perch, lizardfish, batfish, jackfish, barracudas, Napoleon wrasse and sharks. Other creatures include feather stars, giant clams, nudibranches, sea anemone and sea horses.

See also
 List of national parks of Malaysia
 List of reefs

References

External links
 Project of Sarawak's Coral Reef
 Miri Dive Sites

Coral reefs
Miri Division
National parks of Sarawak
South China Sea
Sunda Shelf mangroves